Florence Frandsen Neslen (December 24, 1908 - July 20, 2000) was an American educator and artist.

Life
Frandsen was born on December 24, 1908, in Moroni, Utah. She graduated from Brigham Young University, where she was trained by B.F. Larsen and Calvin Fletcher, and she earned a bachelor's degree and a master's degree.

Frandsen worked as a public school teacher. She taught in many schools, including Springville High School and Granite High School. She became a watercolorist and an oil painter, and she was also a woodblock printer.

Frandsen married H. Edward Neslen, and became known as Florence Neslen. She died on July 20, 2000, and she was buried in Mount Olivet Cemetery in Salt Lake City. Two of her paintings are at the Springville Museum of Art.

References

1908 births
2000 deaths
People from Sanpete County, Utah
Brigham Young University alumni
San Francisco Art Institute alumni
American women painters
American watercolorists
Painters from Utah
20th-century American painters